Easy Living is a 2017 American thriller comedy-drama film written and directed by Adam Keleman and starring Caroline Dhavernas.  It is Keleman's feature directorial debut.

Plot summary

Cast
 Caroline Dhavernas as Sherry Graham
 Elizabeth Marvel as Abby
 Jen Richards as Danny
 McCaleb Burnett as Henry
 Charlie Hofheimer as Norman
 C.J. Wilson as Fred
 Daniel Eric Gold as Ted
 Taylor Richardson as Alice
 Mary Catherine Garrison as Trish

Release
The film was released on September 15, 2017.

Reception
The film has a 78% rating on Rotten Tomatoes based on nine reviews.

Frank Scheck of The Hollywood Reporter gave the film a positive review and wrote, "A character study of an endlessly flawed human being, Easy Living thankfully avoids heavy moralizing or platitudinous bromides and it even makes familiar situations(...)seems fresh."

Alan Ng of Film Threat awarded the film three stars out of five and wrote that the film "is a character study of a real-life Peter Pan, who can’t quite find the doorway into adulthood."

Simi Horwitz of Film Journal International gave the film a positive review and wrote "An exceptional character study of an outlier who lives a Jekyll and Hyde existence in a universe almost devoid of causality."

References

External links
 
 
 

2017 films
2017 comedy-drama films
2017 thriller drama films
American comedy-drama films
American comedy thriller films
American thriller drama films
2010s English-language films
2010s American films